John McEntire (born April 9, 1970 in Portland, Oregon) is an American recording engineer, producer, drummer and multi-instrumentalist, based in Chicago, Illinois. He is a member of both Tortoise and the Sea and Cake.

McEntire started playing drums at age 10.  Throughout high school, he performed in marching bands and studied privately for seven years.  He went on to attend Oberlin Conservatory initially as a percussion major, but eventually switched to study in the school's then newly created program for Technology in Music and Related Arts.

Musical career
McEntire is currently a member of Tortoise, The Sea and Cake, and The Red Krayola.  His drumming work as a sideman can be heard on recordings, such as Since by Richard Buckner, Enantiodromia and Life on the Fly by Azita, Near-Life Experience by Come, Kernel by Seam, Chicago Wednesday by Jandek, and The Spectrum Between by David Grubbs.

While attending Oberlin, he briefly played with Mark Edwards in My Dad Is Dead in 1988, and then joined Bastro with David Grubbs and Bundy K. Brown in 1989.  In 1991, he relocated along with Grubbs and Brown to Chicago where they changed their musical direction and became the first incarnation of Gastr Del Sol. Their debut album, The Serpentine Similar, was released in 1993. McEntire and Brown left to play in Tortoise in 1994, yet McEntire continued to make contributions to Gastr Del Sol's later recordings and performances.

McEntire had also played in Seam, The Stokastikats, Stereolab, and The Oily Bloodmen. He was a principal musician on Jim O'Rourke's Terminal Pharmacy and has appeared on many other solo O'Rourke projects.

Production/engineering work
As a producer and engineer, McEntire has mixed and remixed recordings by many artists. He also owns and operates Soma Electronic Music Studios in Nevada City, California, to which he relocated in 2018 after 25 years in the Wicker Park neighborhood of Chicago and then a brief stint in Los Angeles.

He produces and engineers most of the recordings for his own bands, as well as many of the solo efforts by bandmates Sam Prekop, Archer Prewitt, Jeff Parker, and Doug McCombs.  He has also engineered, produced, and/or mixed albums and tracks for many artists including: Bell Orchestre, Stereolab, Bright Eyes, Bobby Conn, Teenage Fanclub, Sylvain Chauveau, Kaki King, Tom Ze, The Ex, Smog, Trans Am, Eleventh Dream Day, Cougar, Antibalas, Innaway, The For Carnation, Dianogah, U.S. Maple, Chicago Underground Duo, Spookey Ruben, Blur, Pivot, The Fiery Furnaces, The Car Is on Fire, Small Sins, Broken Social Scene, Coldcut, Spoon, Jaga Jazzist, Great 3, Yo La Tengo, Pia Fraus and most recently, La Ciencia Simple.

McEntire is a pioneering user of modern digital audio workstation software, first employing Pro Tools on the 1997 The Sea and Cake album The Fawn and then on Stereolab's Dots and Loops, released later the same year.

References

External links
 John McEntire, Pushing Tortoise, interview
 John McEntire, Rock Reaching, interview
 
 

1970 births
Living people
Musicians from Portland, Oregon
Oberlin College alumni
American indie rock musicians
Record producers from Oregon
20th-century American drummers
American male drummers
Tortoise (band) members
Bastro members
The Sea and Cake members
Red Krayola members
Gastr del Sol members
21st-century American drummers
20th-century American male musicians
21st-century American male musicians